François Calderaro (born 15 June 1964) is a retired French football striker. Whilst at PSG he played as a substitute as they won the 1993 Coupe de France Final against FC Nantes.

References

1964 births
Living people
French footballers
Stade de Reims players
FC Metz players
Paris Saint-Germain F.C. players
Toulouse FC players
Association football forwards
Ligue 1 players
Ligue 2 players